Bahleh (also Romanized as Bahlah; also known as Pahleh) is a village in Anzal-e Jonubi Rural District, Anzal District, Urmia County, West Azerbaijan Province, Iran. At the 2006 census, its population was 751, in 120 families.

References 

Populated places in Urmia County